2 Broke Girls is an American television sitcom created by Michael Patrick King and Whitney Cummings, who also serve as executive producers. The series stars Kat Dennings as Max Black, who comes from a poor underclass family, and Beth Behrs as Caroline Channing, who was born and raised rich but is now down on her luck, working together at a restaurant in the Brooklyn neighborhood of Williamsburg. Each episode ends with a running tally of the money earned towards the $250,000 the girls need to open a cupcake business, whether it increases or decreases.

The series aired on CBS from September 19, 2011, to April 17, 2017.  The series was canceled on May 12, 2017, after six seasons.

With the exception of "Pilot", all episodes start with the word "And", so the titles when combined with the series' name, read, "2 Broke Girls and the Break-up Scene", for example.

Series overview

Episodes

Season 1 (2011–12)

Season 2 (2012–13)

Season 3 (2013–14)

Season 4 (2014–15)

Season 5 (2015–16)

Season 6 (2016–17)

Ratings

Season 3 (2013–14)

Season 4 (2014–15)

Season 5 (2015–16)

Season 6 (2016–17)

References

External links 
 
 

2 Broke Girls